Reesville may refer to:

 Reesville, Ohio, in the United States
 Reesville, Queensland, in Australia